Stade Armandie is a multi-purpose stadium in Agen, France.  It is currently used mostly for rugby union matches and is the home stadium of SU Agen. The stadium is able to hold 14,000 people.

On February 8, 2014, it hosted a Six Nations Under 20s Championship match between France and Italy with France winning 34 - 0.

References

Armandie
Armandie
Multi-purpose stadiums in France
Sports venues in Lot-et-Garonne
Sports venues completed in 1921